"South" is a 1959 British made-for-television play written by Gerald Savory and directed by Mario Prizek. It stars Peter Wyngarde, Graydon Gould and Helena Hughes. It first aired on Play of the Week on 24 November 1959. The production was adapted from Sud, a 1953 play written by Julien Green. The British Film Institute has described it as the "earliest known gay TV drama" in the United Kingdom.

Synopsis
A dashing Polish Army lieutenant named Jan Wicziewsky is in exile in the United States deep South as civil war approaches. He is faced with the question of who he really loves: the plantation owner's angry niece, Miss Regina, or the tall, blond, rugged officer who suddenly arrives at the plantation, a handsome man called Eric MacClure.

Cast
 Peter Wyngarde as Lieutenant Jan Wicziewsky
 Graydon Gould as Eric MacClure 
 Helena Hughes as Regina
 Barbara Assoon as Eliza
 Juliet Cooke as Miss Priolleau
 Noel Dyson as Laura Priolleau
 Karal Gardner as Angelina Broderick
 Alan Gifford as Edward Broderick
 Karl Lanchbury as Jimmy Broderick

Production history
A television play is a live drama performance broadcast from the television studio, and they often were not recorded or if they were, they were later wiped. This production was thought to be a lost film, until it was re-discovered in 2013 by curators at the British Film Institute. Simon McCallum of the BFI said "it just wasn't known that this film existed other than to a few specialist researchers", and the production "is a milestone" in gay cultural history. The curators were stunned to find it, because the 1961 film Victim, with Dirk Bogarde was generally considered the milestone for gay representation on film and TV, but with this discovery, South now becomes the earliest known British gay TV play. Peter Wyngarde who played the lead character was a closeted gay at the time, but it was well-known in the acting world that he was gay.  McCallum said "you have to give Wyngarde a massive pat on the back in terms of the bravery in taking this role. There were quite bad reactions from some of the press." Julien Green who wrote the original play the film is based on, was also gay. The play was set to be performed in London in 1955, but was banned by the Lord Chamberlain, because of the homosexual themes. By 1959, the Lord Chamberlain had eased his hard-line stance on homosexual themes, and Gerald Savory adapted the play for television.

Contemporary reviews
In 1959 a reporter for the Daily Sketch wrote: "I do NOT see anything attractive in the agonies and ecstasies of a pervert, especially in close-up in my sitting room. This is not prudishness. There are some indecencies in life that are best left covered up." A November 1959 review in The Stage, said "Green's dialogue was so full of compassion, understanding and tenderness that his subject didn't seem distasteful, and Mario Prizek, a new Canadian director, toned down his production so much that it kept perfect pace with the script...Peter Wyngarde as Jan, the man who couldn’t talk of his life like other men, gave a stunningly brilliant performance, controlled and delicately pitched". And in describing the plot of the film, they said "So moved, so profound is (Wicziewsky's) love for Eric MacClure that he forces a duel on him and allows himself to be killed rather than live without him."

See also
 List of rediscovered films
 Victim

References

External links
 
 South available to watch at BFI

British television plays
Plays adapted into television shows
British LGBT-related television episodes
1959 television plays
ITV Play of the Week
British LGBT-related television films